Manju Phalswal (born 25 May 1982) is an Indian national field hockey player and the current Captain of the Domestic Delhi team. She plays as a midfielder.

International circuit
Asia Cup February 2004 - Delhi (1st)

Junior World Cup May 2001 - Buenos Aires (9th)

Asian Tour August 2005 - Singapore - 4-Nation Tournament (1st)

May 2004 - Gifu (Japan) - 4-nation Takamadonomiya Tournament (LAST)

4 National Tournament- New Jersey

India Malaysia test match - India

4 Nationes Tournament- South Africa

4 National Tournament- Russia

Shimbashira Cup- Japan

(under 18) Asia Cup-Hong Kong

References

1982 births
Field hockey players from Delhi
Living people
Indian female field hockey players